Bobbi Kristina is a 2017 American biographical drama film about Bobbi Kristina Brown, directed by Ty Hodges and written by Rhonda Baraka. The film stars Joy Rovaris, Nadji Jeter, Demetria McKinney, Vivica A. Fox, Hassan Johnson, and Ricco Ross. The film premiered on TV One on October 8, 2017.

Plot

Cast 
Joy Rovaris as Bobbi Kristina Brown
Nadji Jeter as Nick Gordon
Demetria McKinney as Whitney Houston
Vivica A. Fox as Pat Houston
Hassan Johnson as Bobby Brown
Ricco Ross as Uncle Ray
Candace B. Harris as Taylor
Brooke Butler as Shanna
Carl Kennedy as Gary
Alexandra Reid as Britt
Sherry Richards as Renee
Tobias Truvillion as Butter
Donny Carrington as Gary Michael
Tyler Lain as Josh
Le'Azionna Braden as Young Krissi
Mikari Tarpley as Young Taylor

References

External links
 

2017 television films
2017 films
American biographical drama films
2017 biographical drama films
2010s English-language films
2010s American films